Pizza Connection may refer to:
Pizza Connection (film), a 1985 Italian film
Pizza Connection (video game), a 1994 economic simulation game
The New York Pizza Connection,  the theoretical correlation between pizza and subway fares
Pizza Connection Trial, a U.S. criminal case
, in German politics, a coalition between the CDU/CSU and Alliance 90/The Greens